Sexy Sushi is a French electroclash band formed by Rebeka Warrior and Mitch Silver in Nantes.

Their first albums were released as burned CD-R by alternative distributors like Wonderground. An EP and an album were then released in 2009 by Scandale Records.  Their most recent album, Vous n'allez pas repartir les mains vides, was released in 2013.

Members
Rebeka Warrior (real name Julia Lanoë) born in 1978, is the vocalist and musician in both Sexy Sushi and Mansfield.TYA bands.
Mitch Silver (real name David Grellier) born in 1979, is also the founder of the musical projects College and Valerie.

Discography
 2004: J'en veux j'en veux  … des coups de poing dans les yeux ! (CDR, Merdier Record / WonDerGround Distribution)
 2005: Défonce ton ampli (CDR, Merdier Records / Wonderground)
 2005: Caca (CDR, Merdier Records / Wonderground)
 2006: Ça m’aurait fait chier d’exploser (CDR, Merdier Records / Wonderground)
 2008: Marre Marre Marre (Believe)
 2009: EP Des jambes (SV03, Scandale Records)
 2009: Tu l'as bien mérité ! (SC002, Scandale Records)
 2009: Girlfriend 09 (feat. Näd Mika)
 2010: Château France
 2010: Cyril (L'autre distribution) 
 2011: Mauvaise foi
 2011: Flamme
 2013: Vous n'allez pas repartir les mains vides ?
 2014: Vous en reprendrez bien une part ?

References

External links
  Sexy Sushi on MySpace
  Official site

Musical groups established in 2004
French electronic music groups
Electroclash groups
Musical groups from Pays de la Loire
French musical duos
Electronic music duos
Male–female musical duos